Natallia Anufryienka (born 11 June 1985) is a Belarusian basketball player who competed in the 2008 Summer Olympics.

References

1985 births
Living people
Belarusian women's basketball players
Olympic basketball players of Belarus
Basketball players at the 2008 Summer Olympics
Point guards
People from Babruysk
Shooting guards
Sportspeople from Mogilev Region